Haplogroup Q-P89.1 is a subclade of Y-DNA Haplogroup Q-MEH2. Haplogroup Q-P89.1 is defined by the presence of the P89.1 Single Nucleotide Polymorphism (SNP).  In 2010, Q-P89.1 was reclassified as "private" and removed from the haplotree.

Distribution 
Q-P89.1 has descendants in the Northwest Territory of modern Canada. It was in pre-Columbian American populations that it was discovered.

The Americas
Q-P89.1 is present in pre-Columbian populations in the Canadian Northwest.

Asia
Because samples from Asia have only sporadically been tested for this lineage, its frequency there is uncertain.

Associated SNPs 
Q-P89.1 is currently defined by only the P89.1 SNP.

See also
Human Y-chromosome DNA haplogroup

Y-DNA Q-M242 Subclades

Y-DNA backbone tree

References

External links 
The Y-DNA Haplogroup Q Project

Q-P89.1
Inuvialuit